The Arco Británico (Spanish for British Arch) is a monument on Avenida Brasil, in Valparaíso, Chile. It was donated to the town in 1910 by the British community there to mark the centenary of the Independence of Chile. Designed by the Chilean architect Alfredo Azancot, the arch was unveiled in 1911.

The monument, covered in marble brought from Italy, is surmounted by a British Victorian lion and is decorated with the images of four Britons who participated in the Chilean War of Independence: Thomas Cochrane, Bernardo O'Higgins, Robert Simpson and Jorge O'Brien. It also bears the Chilean and United Kingdom coats of arms.

The arch was visited by Queen Elizabeth II during her official visit to Chile in 1968, and by Prince Charles in 2009.

References
This article is closely based on the Spanish version

Buildings and structures in Valparaíso
Buildings and structures completed in 1911
Triumphal arches
Monuments and memorials in Chile